Älskade andliga sånger, released on 17 October 2007, is a Christer Sjögren studio album, consisting of Christian songs recorded together with Örebro gospel. Recorded in mid-2007, the album is based on songs performed by him inside church buildings and during tours.

Track listing
Amazing Grace
Låt oss alla en gång mötas (Let's All Meet Once)
Still ro och nära
Just a Closer Walk with Thee
O store Gud (How Great Thou Art)
Bred dina vida vingar
He Ain't Heavy, He's My Brother
Han är min sång och glädje
Jag är främling
När du går över floden
Hallelujah
Någon ler
The Lord's Prayer
Räck mig din hand
I Believe
Ol' Man River

Contributors
Christer Sjögren - vocals
Per Lindvall - drums, percussion
Rutger Gunnarsson - bass
Hasse Rosén - guitar
Lasse Wellander - guitar
Peter Ljung - keyboard
Lennart Sjöholm - producer
Örebro gospel - song

Charts

References 

2007 albums
Christer Sjögren albums